Lilyana Vaseva (born 12 August 1955) is a Bulgarian rower who competed in the 1976 Summer Olympics.

In 1976 she was a crew member of the Bulgarian boat which won the silver medal in the coxed fours event.

External links
 profile

1955 births
Living people
Bulgarian female rowers
Olympic rowers of Bulgaria
Rowers at the 1976 Summer Olympics
Olympic silver medalists for Bulgaria
Olympic medalists in rowing
Medalists at the 1976 Summer Olympics